Acacia crenulata is a shrub or tree of the genus Acacia and the subgenus Plurinerves that is endemic to a small area of south western Australia.

Description
It has glabrous branchlets with crenulate-resinous ribbing. Like most species of Acacia it has phyllodes rather than true leaves. It produces yellow flowers.

Distribution
It is native to an area in the Goldfields-Esperance and the Wheatbelt regions of Western Australia where it is commonly situated on breakaways, among granite outcrops and on rocky rises growing in sandy or clay soils. It is found in the Chiddarcooping Rock and Walyahmoning Rock areas near Bullabulling as a part of low Eucalyptus wandoo woodland communities and is often associated with other species of Acacia, Allocasuarina campestris and Melaleuca uncinata.

See also
List of Acacia species

References

crenulata
Acacias of Western Australia
Taxa named by Bruce Maslin
Plants described in 1999